The Consolidated TBY Sea Wolf was a United States Navy torpedo bomber of World War II. A competitor and contemporary to the Grumman TBF Avenger, the Sea Wolf was subject to substantial delays and never saw combat; only 180 of the type were built before cancellation after VJ Day.

Design and development

The original design was not by Consolidated Aircraft, but rather by Vought, who designed the then XTBU-1 Sea Wolf to a 1939 US Navy requirement. The first prototype flew two weeks after Pearl Harbor. Its performance was deemed superior to the Avenger and the Navy placed an order for 1,000 examples.

Several unfortunate incidents intervened; the prototype was damaged in a rough arrested landing trial, and when repaired a month later was again damaged in a collision with a training aircraft. Once repaired again, the prototype was accepted by the Navy. However, by this time Vought was heavily overcommitted to other contracts, especially for the F4U Corsair fighter, and had no production capacity. It was arranged that Consolidated-Vultee would produce the aircraft (as the TBY), but this had to wait until the new production facility in Allentown, Pennsylvania, was complete, which took until late 1943.

Operational history

The production TBYs were radar-equipped, with a radome under the right-hand wing. The first aircraft flew on 20 August 1944. By this time though, the Avenger equipped every torpedo squadron in the Navy, and there was no need for the Sea Wolf; in addition, numerous small problems delayed entry into service. Orders were cancelled after production started, and the 180 built were used for training.

Variants
XTBU-1 Sea Wolf
Prototype three-seat torpedo bomber powered by a R-2800-22 engine, one built.
TBY-1 Sea Wolf
Production variant of the XTBU-1, not built.
TBY-2 Sea Wolf
TBY-1 with an additional radar pod mounted under starboard-wing, 180 built, a further 920 were cancelled.
TBY-3 Sea Wolf
Improved variant, order for 600 cancelled, not built.

Specifications (TBY-2 Sea Wolf)

See also

References

Notes

Further reading
Ginter, Steve, Bill Chana and Phil Prophett. Vought XTBU-1 & TBY-2 Sea Wolf (Naval Fighters number Thirty-Three). Simi Valley, CA: Ginter Books, 1995 . .

External links

 TBY Seawolf at Brown Shoe Navy
 TBY Seawolf at Dave's Warbirds
 AirToAirCombat.Com: Vought TBU-1 Sea Wolf

TBY
TBU
1940s United States bomber aircraft
Single-engined tractor aircraft
Carrier-based aircraft
World War II torpedo bombers of the United States
Mid-wing aircraft
Aircraft first flown in 1941